A Goon squad is a group of thugs or mercenaries, commonly associated with anti-union or pro-union violence.

Goon Squad may also refer to:
 Goon Squad (band), a dance music group assembled by Arthur Baker in the mid-1980s
 "Goon Squad", 1979 song from the Elvis Costello album Armed Forces
 GOONs squad, Guardians of the Oglala Nation, a private paramilitary group active on the Pine Ridge Indian Reservation during the early 1970s
 A Visit from the Goon Squad, a 2010 novel by Jennifer Egan
 "Goon Squad", a song by Deftones from their 2012 album Koi No Yokan
 “The Goon Squad”, a virtual basketball team composed of The Brow, Wet-Fire, Chronos, Arachnneka, & White Mamba which are avatars of current NBA and WNBA players Anthony Davis, Klay Thompson, Damian Lillard, Nneka Ogwumike, & Diana Taurasi from the 2021 film Space Jam: A New Legacy

See also
 Goon (disambiguation)
 Vigilante
 Mercenary
 Thug (disambiguation)